St. Georges Cemetery Caretaker's House is a historic home located at St. Georges, New Castle County, Delaware, United States.  It was built in 1871, and is a -story, "L"-shaped brick dwelling in the Gothic Revival style.  It features a slate covered gable roof with decorative bargeboards at the gable ends.  It was built as the Caretaker's House for St. Georges Presbyterian Church cemetery.

It was added to the National Register of Historic Places in 1982.

References

Houses on the National Register of Historic Places in Delaware
Gothic Revival architecture in Delaware
Houses completed in 1871
Houses in New Castle County, Delaware
National Register of Historic Places in New Castle County, Delaware